Tres Corrales is a village and district in the Caaguazú department of Paraguay.

Sources 
World Gazeteer: Paraguay – World-Gazetteer.com

Populated places in the Caaguazú Department